Palau Pacific Airways (PPA) was a charter airline from Palau.

History 
The airline launched scheduled charter flights between Hong Kong and its base Koror on 7 November 2014. It is often confused with Palau Airways although they are not associated with one another. The start-up intended to operate five times weekly charter services to Hong Kong Chek Lap Kok Airport. The carrier wet-leased a Boeing 737-800 aircraft on an annual contract from Slovakian Aircraft, Crew, Maintenance and Insurance (ACMI) operator: Air Explore. 

Palau Pacific Airways had expanded to service Taipei, Taiwan on January 30, 2016. The airline shut down on 31 August 2018.

The airline was forced to stop its operations due to a lack of Chinese tourists after China had declared Palau an “illegal tour destination”, because Palau continues to maintain links with Taiwan.

In January 2019, the airline was rebounded as Palau Asia Pacific Air,, and it serves both Macau and Hong Kong. The airline is also proposing a new destination to Taiwan Taoyuan International Airport.

Destinations 
Palau Pacific Airways served the following destinations:
Palau - Roman Tmetuchl International Airport base
Hong Kong - Hong Kong International Airport (charter)
Macau - Macau International Airport (charter)
Taipei - Taoyuan International Airport (charter)

Fleet 
Palau Pacific Airways operated the following aircraft:

References

Defunct airlines of Palau
Airlines established in 2014
Airlines disestablished in 2018
Defunct charter airlines
2014 establishments in Palau
2018 disestablishments in Palau